M. Selvarasu (16 March 1957) is an Indian politician and Member of Parliament, elected from Tamil Nadu.

Political career

Selvarasu is a member of the 17th Lok Sabha of India. He represents the Nagapattinam Lok Sabha constituency of Tamil Nadu and is a member of the Communist Party of India (CPI) political party. He was also elected to the Lok Sabha from Nagapattinam constituency candidate in 1989, 1996 and 1998 elections.

References 

Communist Party of India politicians from Tamil Nadu
Living people
India MPs 1989–1991
India MPs 1996–1997
India MPs 1998–1999
Lok Sabha members from Tamil Nadu
People from Nagapattinam district
1957 births